Karnataka State Highway 5, commonly referred to as KA SH 5, is a state highway that runs through Chikballapur and Kolar districts in the state of Karnataka.  The primary destinations of this highway are Chintamani and Kolar. The total length of the highway is 106 km.

Route description 
The route followed by this highway is Bagepalli - Chintamani - Kolar - Bangarpet.

Major junctions

National Highways 
 NH 44 at Bagepalli
 NH 75 at Kolar

State Highways 
 KA SH 94 at Bagepalli
 KA SH 82 at Chintamani
 KA SH 96 at Kolar
 KA SH 95 at Bangarpet

References

See also
 List of State Highways in Karnataka

State Highways in Karnataka
Roads in Kolar district
Roads in Chikkaballapur district